Åmot is the administrative centre of Vinje Municipality in Vestfold og Telemark county, Norway. The village is located at the confluence of the rivers Tokke and Vinjeåi.

The European route E134 highway passes through the village.

References

Vinje
Villages in Vestfold og Telemark